Kanami may refer to:

Kanami (given name), a feminine Japanese given name
Kan'ami (1333–1384), Japanese Noh playwright
Kanami Station, a former railway station in Anamizu, Hōsu District, Ishikawa Prefecture, Japan